Anolis dollfusianus, also known commonly as the coffee anole and el abaniquillo de cafetal in Spanish, is a species of lizard in the family Dactyloidae. The species is native Guatemala and Mexico.

Etymology
The specific name, dollfusianus, is in honor of French zoologist Auguste Dollfus.

Geographic range
A. dollfusianus is found in western Guatemala and in the southernmost Mexican state of Chiapas.

Habitat
The preferred natural habitat of A. dollfusianus is forest, but the species also occurs in coffee plantations.

Reproduction
A. dollfusianus is oviparous.

References

Further reading
Bocourt MF (1873). In: Duméril A[HA], Bocourt MF, Mocquard F (1873). "Études sur les reptiles ". pp. i–xiv, 1–1012. In: Milne Edwards H, Vaillant L (editors) (1870–1909). Recherches Zoologiques pour servir à l'Histoire de la Faune de l'Amérique Centrale et du Mexique. Paris: Mission Scientifique au Mexique et dans l'Amérique. (Impremerie Impériale, printer). (Anolis dollfusianus, new species, pp. 84–85). (in French).
Johnson JD, Mata-Silva V, Garcia Padilla E, Wilson LD (2015). "The Herpetofauna of Chiapas Mexico: composition, distribution, and conservation". Mesoamerican Herpetology 2 (3): 272–329. (Norops dollfusianus).
Köhler G, Acevedo M (2004). "The anoles (genus Norops) of Guatemala. I. The species of the Pacific versant below 1500 m elevation". Salamandra 40 (2): 113–140. (Norops dollfusianus).

Anoles
Reptiles described in 1873
Reptiles of Mexico
Reptiles of Guatemala
Taxa named by Marie Firmin Bocourt